Michael Berry (26 September 1938 – 8 April 2009), known professionally as Lennie Bennett, was an English comedian and game show host.

After attending the Palatine Secondary School in Blackpool, Bennett became a journalist for the West Lancashire Evening Gazette before becoming a professional hypnotist and appearing on the BBC light entertainment programme The Good Old Days in 1969. He starred with Jerry Stevens in the Lennie and Jerry Show, which ran from 1978 to 1980. Bennett was also the host of Punchlines and Lucky Ladders in the 1980s.

He also performed in twelve Royal Variety Shows, and had a brief stint as a chat show host on London Weekend Television in 1982, before working as a speaker on the after-dinner circuit.

Bennett suffered a serious heart attack in 1994, which necessitated a bypass operation. He died at the age of 70 in the Royal Lancaster Infirmary on 8 April 2009, following a fall at his home from which he failed to regain consciousness. His funeral took place at the Carleton Crematorium.

TV appearances
Jokers Wild – panel game, regular guest, ITV, 1972–73
Celebrity Squares – panel game, regular guest, ITV, 1970s
International Cabaret – variety show, host, BBC2, 1978
The Lennie and Jerry Show (originally titled Lennie and Jerry) – sketch show, BBC1, 1978–80
Blankety Blank – game show, regular panellist, BBC1, 1979–80
Punchlines – game show, host, ITV, 1981–84
TSW Opening Night – host, Television South West, 1 January 1982
Names and Games – game show specials, host, ITV, 1984–85
Lucky Ladders – game show, host, ITV, 1988–93
You Bet! – game show, regular panellist, ITV, 1990
Fantasy Football League – guest, BBC, 1995
After They Were Famous – documentary, subject, ITV, 2004

References

External links
 
 Gavin Gaughan, "Lennie Bennett" (obituary), The Guardian, 13 April 2009.
 Obituary in The Daily Telegraph, 13 April 2009.

1938 births
2009 deaths
20th-century English comedians
21st-century English comedians
English game show hosts
English male comedians
English male television actors
English television presenters
People from Blackpool